The 2022 Honda British Talent Cup was the fifth season of the British Talent Cup. The riders used the Honda NSF250R.

Calendar and results

Entry list

Championship standings

References

British Talent Cup